Coregonus maraena, referred to in English as the maraene, maraena whitefish or the whitefish, is a whitefish of the family Salmonidae that occurs in the Baltic Sea basin - in the sea itself and the inflowing rivers, and  in several lakes as landlocked populations. It is found in Denmark, Estonia, Finland, Germany, Latvia, Lithuania, Netherlands, Norway, Poland, Slovakia (Štrbské pleso), Russia and Sweden. As of 2013, it has been listed as a vulnerable species by the IUCN and as endangered by HELCOM.
It is an extremely important fish within the Baltic Sea ecosystem, both for population equilibrium and for the local diets of the surrounding human population. Due to a variety of factors, mostly overfishing, the maraena’s population dwindled to near-extinction levels. Thus, rampant repopulation was enacted to preserve this important fish. 

In the Baltic basin countries, this species has traditionally been known as Coregonus lavaretus (the common whitefish). The name Coregonus maraena has been adopted following the suggestion that the name Coregonus lavaretus should only be applied narrowly to some whitefish populations in France and Switzerland, as advocated by Kottelat and Freyhof, and repeated by the IUCN and FishBase.

References

External links 

maraena
Fish described in 1779
Taxa named by Marcus Elieser Bloch